Raju Tiwari is an Indian politician and member of the Lok Janshakti Party (Ram Vilas). Tiwari was appointed the new president of Bihar LJP (R) in June 2021. He has won the Bihar Legislative Assembly election in 2015 from Govindganj.

References 

Living people
People from East Champaran district
Bihar MLAs 2015–2020
Lok Janshakti Party politicians
1979 births